In terms of key indicators, health in Bolivia ranks nearly last among the Western Hemisphere countries. Only Haiti scores consistently lower. Bolivia's child mortality rate of 69 per 1,000 live births is the worst in South America. Proper nourishment is a constant struggle for many Bolivians. Experts estimate that 7 percent of Bolivian children under the age of five and 23 percent of the entire population suffer from malnutrition. Another health factor in Bolivia is sanitation.

The Human Rights Measurement Initiative finds that Bolivia is fulfilling 78.7% of what it should be fulfilling for the right to health based on its level of income. When looking at the right to health with respect to children, Bolivia achieves 94.2% of what is expected based on its current income. In regards to the right to health amongst the adult population, the country achieves only 84.0% of what is expected based on the nation's level of income.  Bolivia falls into the "very bad" category when evaluating the right to reproductive health because the nation is fulfilling only 58.0% of what the nation is expected to achieve based on the resources (income) it has available.

Health system 
Bolivia's health care system is in the midst of reform, funded in part by international organizations such as the World Bank. The number of physicians practicing in Bolivia has doubled in recent years, to about 130 per 100,000 citizens, a comparable ratio for the region. Current priorities include providing basic health care to more women and children, expanding immunization, and tackling the problems of diarrhea and tuberculosis, which are leading causes of death among children. In 2010, Bolivia created a free Unified Health System (SUS in Spanish) that provided health coverage to 70% of the population which took effect on January 1, 2011. SUS is not a form of insurance but rather a medical services program in healthcare covering 70% of the population. An additional 12.5% of the population is covered under the Sumi (mothers and children under 5 years old) and Health Insurance of the Elderly (over 60 years old) programs.

As a percentage of its national budget, Bolivia's health care expenditures are 4.3 percent, also on a par with regional norms. Bolivia's annual per capita spending of US$145 is lower than in most South American countries.

Health status

Diseases
Bolivians living in rural areas lack proper sanitation and medical services, rendering many helpless against still potent diseases such as malaria (in tropical areas) and Chagas disease. Statistics indicate that 20 percent of the rural population in Bolivia has access to safe water and sanitation.

Major infectious diseases with high degree of risk are:
food or waterborne diseases: bacterial diarrhea, hepatitis A, and typhoid fever
vectorborne diseases: dengue fever, malaria, and yellow fever
water contact disease: leptospirosis (2009)

HIV/AIDS 

UNAIDS, which included estimates of unknown cases, reported in 2005 that 7,000 people in Bolivia were HIV-infected, but estimates vary widely between 3,800 and 17,000 people.

HIV prevalence rates in Bolivia are highest among MSM, who had infection levels of 15 percent in La Paz and nearly 24 percent in Santa Cruz, according to a 2005 report cited by UNAIDS. Homeless boys and girls also appear to be vulnerable to HIV infection. A recent study of street youth in Cochabamba found that 3.5 percent were HIV-positive. In part because of governmental regulation that requires sex workers to regularly visit sexually transmitted infection (STI) clinics for checkups, HIV rates among sex workers have remained low. Patterns from other countries in the region suggest that Bolivian sex workers may be another population at risk for HIV/AIDS.

Obesity
Obesity is a growing health concern. 20.2% of Bolivians are obese.

Cocaine

The Bolivia section of country studies published by the Federal Research Division of the Library of Congress of the USA mentions the following:
Bolivia's booming cocaine industry was also spawning serious health problems for Bolivian youth. In the 1980s, Bolivia became a drug-consuming country, as well as a principal exporter of cocaine. Addiction to coca paste, a cocaine by-product in the form of a cigarette called 'pitillo', was spreading rapidly among city youths. Pitillos were abundantly available in schools and at social gatherings. Other youths who worked as coca-leaf stompers (pisadores), dancing all night on kerosene and acid-soaked leaves, also commonly became addicted. The pitillo addict suffered from serious physical and psychological side-effects caused by highly toxic impurities contained in the unrefined coca paste. Coca-paste addiction statistics were unavailable, and drug treatment centers were practically nonexistent.

In its 2007 Annual Report, the United Nations-dependent International Narcotics Control Board (IFB) called on the government of Bolivia to act immediately to abolish uses of the coca leaf that are contrary to the 1961 Convention. The report further questioned the commercial uses of coca leaves in the production of tea, matte and flour, citing these uses were in contradiction to international drug control treaties. The Bolivian government declined to comply, and sent the Minister of Government, Alfredo Rada to the 51st UN Commission on Narcotics. At that meeting, Rada stated, "Bolivia will defend coca leaf against any threats against traditional leaf consumption by certain international agencies" citing that the traditional uses of the coca leaf were part of the political movement that helped put Evo Morales in office. Rada also pointed to a previous UN declaration of the rights of indigenous peoples, which he used to protect the chewing of the coca leaf as an indigenous tradition. Coca leaf is the raw material of cocaine and its cultivation is considered illegal by the UN.

Evo Morales himself attended the 52nd Session of the UN Narcotics Commission where he spoke in defense of coca leaf production and use. With coca leaves in hand, Morales stated that Bolivia would not prohibit all legally grown coca, but would restrict the excess cultivation of the plant. Morales indicated government efforts to reduce coca production beyond legal uses as the excess production is what ends up in the drug industry. Morales's administration sued the UN Commission in an attempt to have coca leaves removed from the global list of narcotics. In showing the coca leaves, he said, "This is not cocaine" to which he received applause. "I am a consumer of coca", he declared, placing leaves in his mouth and chewing them, to which he again received applause. Morales stated that not only indigenous people use coca leaf, but also other groups including students, miners, professionals and others. Morales claimed that the coca leaf in its natural state has medicinal and nutritional qualities and does not cause harm. He explained that the country's recently approved Political Constitution protects the coca leaf and its cultural heritage because the plant in its natural state is not narcotic. He then went on to ask the commission to include in its list of global narcotics several substances produced with coca leaves as an ingredient, including cocaine hydrochloride, cocaine base paste and cocaine sulfate.

Malnutrition 
Malnutrition is widespread in Bolivia, as Bolivia is the second poorest country to Haiti in the Western Hemisphere and has two thirds of its population below the World Bank poverty benchmark of $2.00/day." To date, there has been substantial foreign food aid implemented in Bolivia, which include initiatives from the USAID, FHI (Food Health International), and the Global Food for Education Initiative. This foreign food aid offers an appreciable supply of food for the impoverished families in Bolivia but is primarily wheat grain, which holds limited nutritional value.

There have been initiatives led by FHI with their aid effort in Bolivia by implementing two programs aimed specifically at Health and Food Security, and Agricultural Intensification and Income Production.  Although these two programs have the same initiative of improving the health of Bolivians, they are actually competing against each other.  This is due to their different priorities.  The health and food security team embrace a more healthy diet for the population while the agricultural team is working towards increasing the marketability of crops.  As a result, these two programs have begun to pull the food aid policy in opposite directions.

This is further emphasized by the instance where the highly nutritional quinoa has been the target and focus for export to the developed world, with the incentive of economic development in Bolivia.  This has caused inflation for quinoa for locals and as a result, the locals rarely consume quinoa, even though the vast majority know of its superior nutritional value."

Lead poisoning 
In 2015, the Bolivian Food Technology Institute (ITA) revealed that the content of lead in table salt was about 400% higher than the permitted maximum according to Bolivian food standards which is 2 μg/g. This study analyzed 23 brands of the most widely consumed brands of table salt and determined the lead content to be between 7.23 μg/g and 9.48 μg/g. Since table salt is the most commonly and widely used food additive, there exists a potential of chronic lead poisoning of the entire population.

Maternal and child health care
Under-5 mortality in 2019 was 26, half of what it was in 2006. Infant mortality was 21.2 in 2019, approximately half of what it was in 2006. Bolivia's maternal mortality rate is 160 per 100,000 which makes it one of the highest in the region and it is estimated to be even higher. Before Evo Morales took office nearly half of all infants were not vaccinated and now nearly all are.

See also
Water supply and sanitation in Bolivia

References